Colonel William Henry Foster (1848 – 27 March 1908) was a British businessman and Conservative Party politician, who owned the Black Dyke Mills in the West Riding of Yorkshire and lived in Hornby Castle in Lancashire. He sat in the House of Commons from 1895 to 1900.

Career 

Foster was the son of William Foster, of Hornby Castle, Lancashire and of Queensbury, near Bradford in the West Riding of Yorkshire. He was educated in Liverpool and abroad, and entered the family's textile business, becoming a director in 1842 of John Foster and Son Ltd in Queensbury, and other businesses.

The family's Black Dyke Mills, which dominated the village of Queensbury, became one of the world's largest makers of worsted cloth. The firm had been founded by his grandfather John Foster (1798–1879), who had retired to Hornby Castle and passed the company to his son William (1821–1884).

Foster was appointed as High Sheriff of Lancashire in June 1891, after the death of George Preston, and in September 1892 he became a Deputy Lieutenant of the West Riding of Yorkshire. He served in the militia as the Lieutenant-Colonel of the 2nd West Yorkshire Yeomanry Cavalry until his retirement in 1892, with the honorary rank of Colonel.

Politics 

He was elected at the 1895 general election as the Member of Parliament (MP) for the Lancaster division of Lancashire. He had been approached in 1893 to stand for Lancaster, but a local meeting selected someone else, and Foster withdrew. However, in August that year another local meeting asked him to stand, and an announcement was made to that effect, but he was not formally adopted as a candidate until 29 June 1895.

After his victory on 19 July 1895, an election petition was lodged, alleging that Foster and his election agents were guilty of "bribery, treating and other corrupt practices". The full list of 117 charges (of which 32 were struck out by the judges) included allegations included 26 cases of treating, 14 of bribery, 13 prohibited persons voting, and that Foster had offered voters employment at his mills in Queensbury. In the hearings at Lancaster Castle, Foster denied the charges, telling the court that at a meeting where his record as an employer had been attacked, he had said that work was available at the mills. Judgment was delivered on 24 January, when all the charges against Foster were dismissed and the petitioners ordered to bear his costs. The crucial issue had been when Foster became a candidate; if the court had found that he was adopted earlier, then his expenses in promoting the Conservative Party in Lancaster before June 1895 should have been included in his election return, although his agent said that this would not have pushed his total expenditure over the limit of £1,400.

Foster held the Lancaster seat until his defeat at the 1900 general election by the narrow margin of 44 votes (0.4% of the total). He stood again in 1906, but was defeated again, this time by a wider margin of 884 votes (7.2%).

Family 
In 1879 Foster married Henrietta, the daughter of Canon J.H. Warneford of Warneford Place in Wiltshire and All Saints Vicarage in Halifax.

Foster died on 27 March 1908, aged 60. His funeral was held in Hornby, and a special train brought the Lord Mayor and other local dignitaries from Bradford. The funeral was also attended by Lancaster's MP Norval Helme, and its Lord Mayor. Over 200 wreaths were sent.

References

External links 
 

1848 births
1908 deaths
Conservative Party (UK) MPs for English constituencies
UK MPs 1895–1900
Politics of Lancaster
High Sheriffs of Lancashire
Deputy Lieutenants of the West Riding of Yorkshire
British textile industry businesspeople
West Yorkshire Yeomanry officers
People from Queensbury, West Yorkshire
19th-century English businesspeople